Xuzhou Medical University  is a provincial university located in Xuzhou, Jiangsu Province, China.

History 
The university was established in 1958 as Xuzhou branch, Nanjing Medical College initially. In 1959, Xinhailian Medical Academy was merged into the branch, which was independent and renamed Xuzhou Medical College in the next year. In 2000, Xuzhou Health Vocational School was merged into the college. With the approval of Ministry of Education, the college was formally renamed Xuzhou Medical University in 2016..

Academics 
The university has good a reputation for its anesthesiology education as one of the medical colleges to establish independent department of anesthesiology first in 1987.

References

External links 
 Xuzhou Medical College

Universities and colleges in Jiangsu